A list of films released in Japan in 1984 (see 1984 in film).

See also
1984 in Japan
1984 in Japanese television

External links
 Japanese films of 1984 at the Internet Movie Database

1984
Lists of 1984 films by country or language
Films